Les Percussions de Strasbourg is a contemporary classical music percussion ensemble made up of six percussionists. Founded in 1962, the ensemble is still performing and commissioning music. The current lineup has played together for 15 years. Their discography includes two albums for Limelight Records. They have premiered over 250 works of contemporary classical music, including Iannis Xenakis's Pléïades, Inventions by Miloslav Kabeláč and Karlheinz Stockhausen's Musik im Bauch. One of their members was Pierre Moerlen.

References

External links
Official website
Video of the ensemble performing in 2010
Partial discography
  Photo, 1971 Les Percussions de Strasbourg touring Southern Africa, dedicated to tour organiser Hans Adler.

Contemporary classical music ensembles
Percussion ensembles